This is a list of Saint Francis players in the NFL Draft.

Key

Selections

References

Lists of National Football League draftees by college football team

Saint Francis Red Flash NFL Draft